Gary Henley-Smith is a New Zealand sprinter and professional rugby league footballer who played in the 1970s and 1980s.

Early years
Henley-Smith attended Auckland Grammar School, where he was Auckland and New Zealand secondary schools senior boys 100m and 200m champion and held several records.

He held the New Zealand junior men's 100m and 200m records at 10.4s and 21.7s. His 10.4s 100m record, set in 1977, stood for 13 years.

Athletics career
Henley-Smith was a member of the Oceania team at the World Cup in Germany in 1977. That same year he joined Washington State University on a scholarship, spending four years in the United States. When he returned he was a member of Waitakere City Athletic Club and was the New Zealand Amateur Athletic Association 100m and 200m national champion in 1982 and 1983.

He missed selection for the Commonwealth Games in 1978 due to a stress fracture.

He competed in New Zealand's 4 × 100 metres relay team at the 1990 Commonwealth Games in Auckland.

Rugby league playing career
Henley-Smith spent the 1985–86 Rugby Football League season playing rugby league in England, joining Wigan, he played , i.e. number 2, in Wigan's 14–8 victory over New Zealand in the 1985 New Zealand rugby league tour of Great Britain and France match at Central Park, Wigan on Sunday 6 October 1985, and played  (replaced by interchange/substitute Steve Hampson) in Wigan's 34–8 victory over Warrington in the 1985 Lancashire County Cup Final during the 1985–86 season at Knowsley Road, St. Helens, on Sunday 13 October 1985.

Later years
Henley-Smith spent a number of years as a physical education teacher at St Paul's Collegiate School in Hamilton, New Zealand, before moving to Scots College, Wellington as Director of Boarding.

References

External links
Statistics at wigan.rlfans.com

Living people
Athletes (track and field) at the 1990 Commonwealth Games
Commonwealth Games competitors for New Zealand
London Broncos players
New Zealand male sprinters
New Zealand rugby league players
New Zealand schoolteachers
People educated at Auckland Grammar School
Place of birth missing (living people)
Rugby league wingers
Washington State University alumni
Wigan Warriors players
Year of birth missing (living people)